B&M is a chain of discount stores in the UK.

B&M may also refer to:

 Black & Mild, a cigar brand
 Bolliger & Mabillard, a Swiss roller coaster manufacturer
 Boston and Maine Railroad
 Brasil & Movimento, a Brazilian motorcycle manufacturer
 Brick and mortar

See also 
 BM (disambiguation)

de:B&M